Shane Wilson is a sculptor who has lived and worked in Yukon and British Columbia, Canada.  His principal mediums are antler, horn, ivory, and bronze, from which he creates sculpture in his signature style, a juxtaposition of abstract organic and non-organic shapes.

Shows
Art of the Commons, Wildlife Art Journal (online), Jan - Feb 2011
Art of the Commons, Wildlife Art Journal (online), Spring 2010
Northern Encounters '99: A Circumpolar Festival of the Arts, Toronto and Kleinburg, Ontario, Canada, 1999

Publishing credits
"Fine Art at Four Seasons Toronto", by Elaine Glusac, Four Seasons Magazine - On Line Version, June 2012
"True North", by Elaine Glusac, Four Seasons Magazine, Issue 2, p. 166, June 2013
Ice Floe II, Cover art ("Self Portrait, 2009"), Edited by Shannon Gramse and Sarah Kirk, University of Alaska Press, Fairbanks, Alaska, 2011
"Artist Workspaces: Shane Wilson's Studio", Branch Magazine: Private Parts, Issue 6, July 2011
Algonquin Art Centre Blog and Newsletter: "Interview with Shane Wilson", Algonquin Art Centre, Algonquin Provincial Park, Ontario, Canada, June 2011
"Artist Feature: Shane Wilson", International Year of Forests: An Artist's Perspective, Gallery Program 2011, Algonquin Art Centre, Algonquin Provincial Park, Ontario, Canada, Summer 2011
"Feature Artist: Shane Wilson", Branch Magazine: Wild, Issue 5, April 2011
Series Summer School of the Arts Course Catalogue Red Deer College (Detail of 'Male Seahorse' used on the cover and header graphics), Red Deer, Alberta, 2011
"Wildfowl Art of a Different Nature", by Jim Clark (Jim details his learning experiences with master carvers Floyd Scholz and Shane Wilson), Wildfowl Art: The Journal of the Ward Museum of Wildfowl Art, Summer Issue, p. 22, 2010
"Collaborations" ("The Shooting of Dan McGrew", with Dwayne Cull and Robert Service), Branch Magazine: Home, Issue 2.2, August 2010
"Shane Wilson: Honouring the Power of Wild Life", by Todd Wilkinson, Wildlife Art Journal, Spring, 2010
"Shane Wilson: Honouring the Power of Wild Life", by Todd Wilkinson, Trophy Rooms from Around the World, Vol. 15, p. 158-167, 2010
Antlers: A Guide to Collecting, Scoring, Mounting, and Carving, by Dennis Walrod ("Celtic Confusion, 1998" pic and artist bio, page 158), 2005

See also
Ivory Carving
Jim Robb (painter)
List of Yukoners

References

External links
Official website

Canadian sculptors
Living people
People from the Regional District of Kitimat–Stikine
Year of birth missing (living people)
Artists from Yukon